Clubes City Club is the wholesale club of Mexican grocery store Soriana founded in 2002, in this same year it opened the first club in Torreón, Coahuila, Mexico in Fundadores Square, that also has a Soriana store. As of 2021 it has 34 stores.

City Life magazine

In February 2004, City Club edited the first copy of its magazine, called City Life. This one contains several information about the store, products and many other temporary available promos of the store.

Own brands 
Member's Choice, similar to Sam's Club's Member's Mark and Costco's Kirkland Signature.
Kitchen Solutions, similar to Sam's Club's Bakers & Chiefs.
École, stationery products.
X-Cargo, back packs.

References

External links
  

Supermarkets of Mexico
Soriana
Retail companies established in 2002
Retail companies of Mexico